WJS may refer to:

West Jesmond Metro station, Newcastle upon Tyne, Tyne and Wear Metro station code
William James Society, an interdisciplinary professional society
New Taipei City Wan Jin Shi Marathon, an annual gold label road race in New Taipei City, Taiwan